Thessaloniki Olympic Museum, the unique Olympic Museum of Greece, is situated at Thessaloniki, Central Macedonia, Greece. The museum is located on the confluence and educational, athletic and cultural routes of the city. It stands next to the Kaftanzoglio National Stadium and the Aristotle University.

History
The museum was established in 1998 with the name “Sports Museum” – being the unique sports museum in Greece – with the support of the Ministry of Culture, the Special Secretariat for Sports of Macedonia–Thrace, Athletic Unions and Associations of Local Authorities.

The aim of the museum is to collect, conserve, record and establish the sport history and to promote it in an active and vivid place, having a mainly educative character. Since its establishment and until 2004, the museum was housed on the floor of a neo-classical building, where the limited space – that was accorded by the Hellenic Railways Organization (OSE) – of 300m2, constrained its exhibitional and educational activities.

During Olympic Year 2004, the museum relocated to a new building primarily designed to serve its needs
into the building block of the Kaftanzoglio Stadium, which hosted the preliminary games of the Athens Olympic Games 2004. The new building was inaugurated by the president of the International Olympic Committee, Mr. Jacques Rogge. It is a modern building, of 4500m2, which was designed and constructed according to the specifications that sets the modern museological architecture.

On January 30 the International Olympic Committee, after the proposal from the Hellenic Olympic Committee and acknowledging its contribution to the athletic and cultural section, renamed the museum “Thessaloniki Olympic Museum”. The organizing of the first permanent exhibition dedicated to Olympic Games and Olympic Sports was the immediate priority of the new exhibition policy. The exhibition consists of historical records and objects of the Greek Medalists, medals, torches, memorabilia from the Olympic organizations and athletic equipment. The new mission of the museum is not only recording and promoting of the sport heritage but the conservation and prominence of the national Olympic history and of the Olympic ideal.

Thessaloniki Olympic Museum consists of four exhibition halls (permanent exhibition dedicated to Olympic Games titled “Prominence of Sport History and Olympic Ideal”, permanent machine interactive exhibition titled “Science of Sports”, permanent exhibition hall housing a parallel exhibition and simulation of track and field stadium and finally, exhibition hall of temporary exhibitions). All exhibition halls conclude recreation ground for educational programs and workshops. Furthermore, the museum has communal halls, an amphitheatre with 300 seats, two halls of manifold uses, shop and a large foyer where temporary exhibitions of small scale and events can be housed.

The new building standards resulted in the redeployment of the museum's missions and in the organization of the permanent Olympic and sport collection, that consists of donations of personal belongings from Greek athletes that have excelled in their sport section, athletic federations, private collections, independent collectors, etc.                                                                                                                                                                                                      
The new policy on collection of the museum is centered to the presentation of exhibitions which are always focused on the triptych “body, spirit and soul” with athletic, historic and cultural interest. The exhibitions that have been produced are divided in long-term exhibitions, temporary exhibitions, interactive and artistic exhibitions of further interest.

One of the primary aims of Thessaloniki Olympic Museum is to approach young people and children, promoting the museum as a friendly place and converting a visit to a pleasant experience. Every exhibition is supported by a variety of educational programs, while educational workshops are performed on weekends, summer workshops and theatrical classes.

Being a modern cultural institution pays great attention to new technologies and their uses in the museum's policy in collections, exhibitions and communication. In 2007, a digital tour in the “Track and Field” exhibition was created while two other interactive exhibitions, “Paralympics” and “Medals and Torches” can be found in the website  of the museum.

The communication of Thessaloniki Olympic Museum with the public is achieved through its newsletter and monthly electronic information. Moreover, the museum publishes catalogues from its exhibitions and transcripts from its conferences.

In the course of these ten years, the museum has developed a variety of collaborations with Cultural Institutions and European or International Museums. More specifically, Thessaloniki Olympic Museum is member of the International Sport Heritage Association (I.S.H.A.), of International Council of Museums (I.C.O.M.) and from 2007, member of Olympic Museum Network. It has also developed international collaborations with representatives of administration of sport cultural heritage of Europe and Balkans that were consummated through memorandums of collaboration.

Exhibitions

Permanent Exhibition
Olympic Games

Long-term Temporary Exhibitions / Great Exhibition Productions
Chess and its History (15/1/ 1998 -  28/2/1999)
Greek Medalists Exhibition: ‘’1896-1996…100 years of Modern Olympic Games’’ (24/3/2000 -  23/7/2000) 
Nautical Sports Exhibition – Canoe-kayak’’ (2/12/2001 -  2/12/2002)
Football Exhibition:  ‘’Greek and International Football History’’ (5/8/2004 -  5/8/2005) 
Track and Field Exhibition: ‘’On your marks…’’ -  (3/3/2006 - 15/7/2008)

Exhibitions of Historical Interest
Ancient Stadium and Games in Antiquity (5/11/2005 -  5/10/2007
Testimonies and Stamps from International Olympic Games, Athens 1906 (16 – 30/6/ 2006)
Ancient Theaters of East Mediterranean (21/11/2007 -  30/6/2009)

Artistic Exhibitions
Dinner / action 32 (15/10/2007 – 10/11/2007)

Travel Exhibitions
Ancient Stadium and Games in Antiquity
Ancient Theaters of East Mediterranean

Interactive Exhibitions
Science of Sports’ (From 27/6/2007)

Digital Interactive Exhibitions
Paralympics (From 13/3/2009)
Medals and Torches (From 13/3/2009)

References
"Commemorative Catalogue",Thessaloniki Olympic Museum, Thessaloniki 2008
Official website 

Museums in Thessaloniki
Olympic
Olympic museums
Museums established in 1998
1998 establishments in Greece